Pyrrolidine dithiocarbamate (PDTC) are a family of closely related drugs used for a metal chelation, induction of G1 phase cell cycle arrest, and preventing induction of nitric oxide synthase.

Pyrrolidine dithiocarbamate binds zinc such that the resulting complex can enter the cell and inhibit viral RNA-dependent RNA polymerase.

Reactions
Pyrrolidine dithiocarbamate, like other dithiocarbamates, forms coordination complexes with a variety of transition metals.

See also
 ionophore

References

Pyrrolidines
Dithiocarbamates